Stenalia sectitarsis is a beetle in the genus Stenalia of the family Mordellidae. The date of finding it is unknown.

References

sectitarsis